John Gutch may refer to:
John Gutch (clergyman) (1746–1831), English Anglican clergyman and official of the University of Oxford
John Mathew Gutch (1776–1861), English journalist and historian
John Wheeley Gough Gutch (1809–1862), British surgeon and editor
John Gutch (colonial administrator) (1905–1988), British colonial administrator who served as High Commissioner for the Western Pacific and Governor of the Solomon Islands